The Nash House is a historic house at 409 East 6th Street in Little Rock, Arkansas.  It is a two-story wood-frame structure, with a hip roof and weatherboard siding.  The main facade is divided in two, the right half recessed to create a porch on the right side, supported by a pair of two-story Ionic column.  The roof has an extended eave with modillions, and a hip-roof dormer projects to the front, with an elaborate three-part window.  The house was designed by Charles L. Thompson and built about 1907.

The house was listed on the National Register of Historic Places in 1982.

See also
Nash House (601 Rock Street), a similar Thompson design just around the corner

References

Houses on the National Register of Historic Places in Arkansas
Colonial Revival architecture in Arkansas
Houses completed in 1907
Houses in Little Rock, Arkansas
National Register of Historic Places in Little Rock, Arkansas
Historic district contributing properties in Arkansas